Joseph von Hagens (1826, Düsseldorf -1899, Düsseldorf) was a German entomologist who specialised in Hymenoptera especially Apidae and Coleoptera.
He was a regional court judge in Dusseldorf.His collection of Apidae was held by the now destroyed Dominikaner-Kloster 'Trans Cedron' Venlo

Works
partial list
(1874) Genitalien der männlichen Bienen als vorzügliche Mittel zur Artbestimmung. Verhandlungen des Naturhistorischen Vereins der Preussischen Rheinlande und Westfalens, 24: 64; Bonn.
(1874): Ueber die Genitalien der männlichen Bienen, besonders der Gattung Sphecodes. Berliner Entomologische Zeitschrift, 18: 25; Berlin.
(1875): Über Bienen- und Ameisenzwitter. Verhandlungen des Naturhistorischen Vereins der Preussischen Rheinlande und Westfalens, 32: 37; Bonn.
(1876): Die Genitalien der männlichen Bienen. Tageblatt der Versammlung Deutscher Naturforscher und Aerzte, 49: 175; Berlin.
(1877): Die Bienengattung Sphecodes. Entomologische Nachrichten, 3: 53;Putbus.pdf
(1882): Ueber die männlichen Genitalien der Bienen-Gattung Sphecodes. Deutsche Entomologische Zeitschrift, 26: 209; Berlin.

References
Heinrich Wolf, 2006 Dr. Joseph von Hagens, 1826-1899, zum Gedächtnis  Jahresberichte des Naturwissenschaftlichen Vereins Wuppertal e.V.; 59. Heft; 2006 Zobodat pdf
Gaedicke in Groll, E. K. (Hrsg.): Biografien der Entomologen der Welt : Datenbank. Version 4.15 : Senckenberg Deutsches Entomologisches Institut, 2010.

German entomologists
1899 deaths
1826 births